The Jawaharlal Nehru Award for International Understanding is an international award presented by the Government of India in honour of Jawaharlal Nehru, the country's first prime minister.

History
It was established in 1965 and is administered by the Indian Council for Cultural Relations (ICCR) to people "for their outstanding contribution to the promotion of international understanding, goodwill and friendship among people of the world". The money constituent of this award is 2.5 million rupees.

Recipients
The following people have received this award. No prize was awarded in 1986 and between 1995 and 2003; the last award was in 2009.

References

International awards
Indian awards
Awards established in 1965
Monuments and memorials to Jawaharlal Nehru